Airdrie Academy is a secondary school within Airdrie, North Lanarkshire, Scotland.

Admissions
It has a current roll of approximately 1,100 pupils.  As part of Education 2010, a new building was opened in October 2006 to replace the previous one, parts of which had been in use for almost 70 years.

The current head teacher is Martin Anderson. He is supported by a senior management team composed of: Allison Dewar, MaryJane Hunter, Graeme Nolan and Claire O'Neill

History 
Founded in 1849, Airdrie Academy exists today in its third incarnation.  The Academy moved to its current site on South Commonhead Avenue in 1941.   When it was built in the midst of World War II, the new building cost a little over £100,000 at the time.  It was first located on Cairnhill Road in a building that housed Alexandra Primary School. The original building has since been demolished to make way for housing.

Grammar school
From its inception, Airdrie Academy was the senior secondary school in Airdrie: pupils who did not pass an exam on leaving primary school would go to the now defunct Airdrie High.

Comprehensive
This system changed in the late 1960s when it became a full six-year comprehensive, nearly tripling the school roll to 1800.  To cope with the increase the South Commonhead Avenue site's existing 'A-Block' was expanded into a larger campus with specific buildings for Science and Technology and a fourth 'House Block' with six dining halls and three floors of modern classrooms.

Though enhanced and expanded over the years, the building fell into disrepair with students having to be taught in portable buildings during the early 2000s whilst asbestos was removed from the Science Block.  After 60 years of service, the building was reaching the end of its serviceable life and North Lanarkshire Council began exploring alternatives.

In December 1988 there was a meningitis outbreak, resulting in the death of a 40-year-old teacher.

New building

Vigorous lobbying from the school's pupils, teaching staff and the local MSP stopped the school from merging with Caldervale High in a proposed super-campus with over 2000 pupils.  Instead, parents and pupils were invited to select a design for a new Airdrie Academy to be built on the playing fields of its current site. The selected design - similar to most other new schools in the county - was completed in October 2006 and is considerably smaller. The new building cost £26 million.

Over the remaining academic year, the old buildings were demolished and the land prepared for new sports fields.  During this time one wing of the old A-Block was set on fire by vandals.  Demolition moved on and in January 2007 the 'Dome' part of the old building was pulled down.

Notable former pupils

 William Whigham Fletcher FRSE, biologist
 Charles Hammond, chief executive since 2000 of Forth Ports
 Alan Morton, footballer
 Paul Towndrow, saxophonist
 Amanda Hendrick, model
 Grant Harrold, The Royal Butler, Britain's etiquette expert and broadcaster

Grammar school
 Sir George G. Macfarlane CB, engineer, scientific administrator, public servant, director from 1962-7 of the Royal Radar Establishment (wartime scientist working on radar); designed the Royal Radar Establishment Automatic Computer (RREAC), the first transistor digital computer
 James Bell Pettigrew, Chandos Professor of Medicine and Anatomy from 1875-1908 at the University of St Andrews
 Sir John Wilson, 1st Baronet, Liberal Unionist Party MP from 1895-1906 for Falkirk Burghs
 James Davidson, JP FRIBA, local architect and tenth President of the Airdrie Savings Bank.

References

External links

Airdrie Academy's page on Scottish Schools Online

Secondary schools in North Lanarkshire
Airdrie, North Lanarkshire
1849 establishments in Scotland
Educational institutions established in 1849